Dana Holanová, née Novotná, is a former ice dancer who represented Czechoslovakia. With Jaromír Holan, she is the 1967 Prague Skate silver medalist, the 1967 Prize of Moscow News bronze medalist, and a two-time Czechoslovak national champion. They finished in the top ten at three ISU Championships.

Personal life 
Holanová was born Dana Novotná. She married Jaromír Holan and changed her surname to Holanová (feminine form of Holan) in 1968. Their daughter, Canadian soccer player Martina Franko, was born on 13 January 1976 in Los Altos, California.

Career 
Novotná competed in partnership with Jaroslav Hainz during at least two seasons. The duo won bronze medals at the 1965 Blue Swords and 1966 Prize of Moscow News. They also took bronze at two Czechoslovak Championships. They placed 11th at the 1967 European Championships in Ljubljana, Yugoslavia, and 17th at the 1967 World Championships in Vienna, Austria.

Novotná teamed up with Jaromír Holan in 1967. In their first season together, they won silver at the 1967 Prague Skate, bronze at the 1967 Prize of Moscow News, and gold at the Czechoslovak Championships. They placed tenth at the 1968 European Championships in Västerås, Sweden.

The following season, she began competing as Dana Holanová. After winning their second national title, the duo placed 7th at the 1969 European Championships in Garmisch-Partenkirchen, West Germany, and 8th at the 1969 World Championships in Colorado Springs, Colorado, United States.

Competitive highlights

With Holan

With Hainz

References 

Czechoslovak female ice dancers
Living people
Year of birth missing (living people)